Chiara Charlotte Mastroianni (born 28 May 1972) is a French actress and singer. She is the daughter of Marcello Mastroianni and Catherine Deneuve.

Early life
Mastroianni was born to French actress Catherine Deneuve and Italian actor Marcello Mastroianni. Her parents were both married to other people at the time of their affair and stayed together for four years, separating in 1975, when Chiara was two years old. She later revealed that she could not recall them being together: "I've never seen my parents together, never in my whole life. They split when I was two, so I've no recollection of them as a couple. I've never even seen them kiss except in the movies."

Mastroianni has two half-siblings, a brother, Christian Vadim, from her mother's relationship with director Roger Vadim, and a sister, Barbara Mastroianni, from her father's marriage to actress Flora Carabella. Carabella is rumoured to have offered to adopt Mastroianni and raise her with her older sister as both her parents worked often and travelled from home, an offer Deneuve rejected.

Through her mother, Mastroianni is connected to the famous Dorléac family of actors, which includes her maternal grandparents, Maurice Dorléac and Renée Simonot, and her aunts, Françoise Dorléac (who died 5 years before Chiara was born) and Sylvie Dorléac.

Career

Mastroianni earned a César Award nomination for her first feature film appearance in André Téchiné's My Favorite Season (1993), starring her mother in the lead role. The next year she played Kim Basinger's assistant in Prêt-à-Porter, directed by Robert Altman. Her first starring role came in 1995, opposite Melvil Poupaud in Le Journal du séducteur, a romantic comedy inspired by "The Seducer's Diary" chapter from Søren Kierkegaard's Either/Or. She worked with Poupaud again in Three Lives and Only One Death (1996), playing the daughter of her real-life father, and in Time Regained (1999), also starring her mother.

Along with a few supporting performances in French films, she appeared in Gregg Araki's Nowhere (1997) and took time off to have her first child with sculptor Pierre Thoretton. She returned to filmmaking to star in Manoel de Oliveira's The Letter (1999), based on Madame de La Fayette's novel La Princesse de Clèves.

After appearances in Mike Figgis's Hotel (2001) and Le parole di mio padre (2001), she played the lead in Delphine Gleize's interconnected drama Carnages (2002), a winner at several international film festivals. In 2003, she starred in the comedy drama Il est plus facile pour un chameau....

In July 2016, Mastroianni was named a member of the main competition jury for the 73rd Venice International Film Festival. In 2019 she won the Un Certain Regard Best Performance award for On a Magical Night.

Collaborations
Mastroianni is a friend and frequent collaborator of French filmmaker Christophe Honoré. She has appeared in roughly half of his films in either major roles or cameos, beginning with the 2007 film Love Songs.

Before her father's death she appeared in two films with him, Prêt-à-Porter (1994) and Three Lives and Only One Death (1996).

Mastroianni also works frequently with her mother; they often play mother and daughter onscreen. Mastroianni first appeared in one of Deneuve's films in 1979 in an uncredited role in Us Two. Her second onscreen appearance also occurred in one of her mother's films, My Favorite Season (1993). Other notable films in which Mastroianni has acted opposite Deneuve include Persepolis, A Christmas Tale, Three Hearts and Claire Darling.

Mastroianni collaborated with her then-husband, musician Benjamin Biolay, on the album Home, released in 2004. She also appeared on the track ¡Encore Encore! on Biolay's 2017 album Volver.

Personal life
Mastroianni dated actor Melvil Poupaud for four years from the age of 16 to 20. He encouraged her to pursue acting as a career and they remained friends for decades, with Poupaud saying he still loved her in 2018.

Mastroianni had a relationship with French sculptor Pierre Thoretton. They have a son, Milo.

In 2002, Mastroianni married singer Benjamin Biolay. They had a daughter, Anna, in 2003, and divorced in 2005.

Filmography

References

External links

1972 births
Living people
French film actresses
Actresses from Paris
French people of Italian descent
21st-century French singers
21st-century French women singers
Dorléac family